Thatto Heath Crusaders is an amateur rugby league club situated in Thatto Heath, St Helens, Merseyside. The club currently competes in the National Conference League Premier Division

History

Thatto Heath RLFC began life in 1981, originally formed by ex-St Helens R.F.C. player Frankie Barrow. The team began competing in the North West Counties 4th Division, and the ‘A’ Team entered Division 5.

The team progressed through the divisions rapidly and finished the 1986−87 season by lifting the North West Counties Premier Division Championship Trophy, the St Helens Cup and they took out the BARLA National Cup Final with a 15–8 victory over the National Conference League Champions Heworth. Captain John McCabe entered the record books as the only player to appear on the winning side in five National Cup Finals.

During the next 20 years Thatto Heath enjoyed enormous success, including the National Cup Trophy, a record five County Cups, two Champions Challenge successes, a record seven North West Counties Premier Division titles, two North West Counties Challenge Cups, three North West Counties Premier Challenge Cups and eight St Helens Cups. It was during this period the club recorded their most famous win, against Chorley Chieftains 27−12 in the Silk Cut Challenge Cup third round in January 1996.

Over the years, the club has produced numerous players who have moved on to join the professional ranks including Andy Brown, Gary Forber, Scott Ranson, Stuart Wakefield, Barry Ashall (Swinton), Darren Harris, Paul Bishop, Darren Abram, Gary Sanderson (Warrington), Derrick Seabrook, Steve Dudley (St Helens), Neil Slater (Trafford Borough), Chris Honey (Barrow), Arthur Bradshaw (Salford) and in more recent times Ray Waring, Ste Gee, Mark Gleave and Lydon Smith (Chorley Chieftains). Alex Murphy was also a graduate from the club.

During 1999, the club found themselves without a ground so a merger was proposed with another local rugby league club, St Helens Crusaders. With the approval of the SIDAC social club, the club then became Thatto Heath Crusaders – St. Helens.

The club was eventually elected to the National Conference League in 2000–01. Thatto Heath took out the National Conference Division 2 Championship title that same year.

In 2007 Thatto Heath went up rapidly through the leagues to the championship.

Thatto Heath won the Division One title in 2010 and promotion to the Premiership and in 2011 Thatto Heath went on to win the Conference League Premiership title defeating Siddal in the final. Captained by Mark Beech, Crusaders then went on to become European champions the same year.

In 2015 Thatto Heath were relegated from the Premier Division after finishing 11 from 12 teams, ending their five-year stay in the top flight. Thatto Heath appeared in the playoffs in each of the seasons in the Premier Division (except for 2015), including finishing top of the table in 2011 and 2013.

2023 Squad

Juniors
Thatto Heath run a junior team in the Gillette National Youth League.

Honours
 National Conference League Premier Division
 Winners (2): 2010–11, 2017, 2021
 National Conference League Division One
 Winners (3): 2002–03, 2009–10, 2016
 National Conference League Division Two
 Winners (1): 2000–01
 BARLA National Cup
 Winners (3): 1986–87, 2000–01, 2018–19
 BARLA Lancashire Cup
 Winners (5): 1988–89, 1989–90, 1992–93, 1996–97, 1999–2000

Women's team 

Thatto Heath Crusaders have a successful women's side being founding members of the RFL Women's Super League in 2017 following becoming league champions in 2016. The club also won the Women's Challenge Cup four years in a row from 2013 to 2016. Ahead of the 2018 season, the side were bought out by St Helens R.F.C.

While this means that they no longer play in the top tier of Women's competition, as of the 2021 season they continue to field teams in lower leagues (e.g. National Conference League) under the Thatto Heath Crusaders name.

Honours
RFL Women's Rugby League:
Grand Final (1): 2016
League Leaders (1): 2016
Women's Challenge Cup (4): 2013, 2014, 2015, 2016

References

External links 

The club on the NCL website

Rugby league teams in Merseyside
BARLA teams
Rugby clubs established in 1981
1981 establishments in England
Women's rugby league teams in England
English rugby league teams